Osorio is a given name and surname.

Osorio or Osório may also refer to:

People
Manuel Luís Osório, Marquis of Erval (May 10, 1808 – October 4, 1879), Brazilian military officer, monarchist and politician
António de Sousa Horta Sarmento Osório (1882–1960), lawyer, economist and politician
António Lino de Sousa Horta Osório (b. 1933), lawyer and sportsman, son of the above
António Mota de Sousa Horta Osório (b. 1964), businessman, son of the above

Places
 Osório, Rio Grande do Sul, a city in Rio Grande do Sul, Brazil
 Pedro Osório, a municipality in Rio Grande do Sul, Brazil
 Acatlán de Osorio, a town in Puebla, Mexico

Other uses
 Osorio, a play by Samuel Taylor Coleridge
 EE-T1 Osório, Brazilian battle tank

See also
 Osor (disambiguation)